Luzuriaga marginata, commonly known as almond flower, is a woody vine that is native to the southern parts of Chile and Argentina as well as the Falkland Islands. Plants grow to 3 metres high and have pale, glossy green leaves that are up to 22 mm long. Perfumed flowers about 20 mm in diameter are produced in the leaf axils in summer. These are followed by dark purple berries that are up to 10 mm in diameter.

References

Alstroemeriaceae
Flora of Argentina
Flora of Chile
Flora of the Falkland Islands